Henry Claud Lisle (December 12, 1848 – 1916) was an English-born lawyer and political figure in Saskatchewan, Canada. He represented Lloydminster in the Legislative Assembly of Saskatchewan from 1908 to 1912 as a Liberal.

He was born in Audlem, Cheshire, the son of Claud Lewis Lisle, and educated in Norwich, Norfolk. In 1870, Lisle married Elizabeth Corfield. He lived in Lloydminster, Saskatchewan.

References 

Saskatchewan Liberal Party MLAs
1846 births
1916 deaths
English emigrants to Canada
People from Lloydminster
Lawyers in Saskatchewan